The anthem of the Táchira State, Venezuela, was written by Ramón Eugenio Vargas; the music was composed by Miguel Ángel Espinel. It was adopted in 1912, after a contest promoted by the regional government. The current anthem is the third made for the state.

Lyrics in Spanish Language
Chorus
Las glorias de la Patria,
sus fueros de Nación,
unidos defendamos
con ínclito valor.

I
Somos libres. Las férreas cadenas
del esclavo rompiéronse ya;
el hogar tachirense sonríe
bajo un sol todo luz:La igualdad.

II
Extinguidos los odios añejos
Perseguimos un solo ideal:
Que prospere la tierra nativa
Bajo un cielo de amor y de paz.

III
El trabajo es la fuerza suprema
Que nos lleva cual nuevo Titán
A la meta sublime y gloriosa
De los pueblos que saben triunfar.

IV
Que en el Táchira ondule por siempre
como enseña de honor regional,
con la unión y altivez de sus hijos,
el trabajo, la paz, la igualdad.

See also
 List of anthems of Venezuela

Anthems of Venezuela
Spanish-language songs